Alexandros is a village and a community of the municipal unit of Lefkada (city), Greece in the island of Lefkada.  The community includes the villages Nikiana (pop. 724 in 2011), Alexandros (pop. 22) and Kollyvata (pop. 6). Nikiana is situated on the east coast of the island, 6 km east of Karya and 8 km south of Lefkada city.

Population

External links
Alexandros on GTP Travel Pages (in English and Greek)

See also

List of settlements in the Lefkada regional unit

References

Populated places in Lefkada (regional unit)